The Europe/Africa Zone was one of three zones of regional competition in the 2013 Fed Cup.

Group I
 Venue: Municipal Tennis Club, Eilat, Israel (hard, outdoors)
 Date: 6–10 February

The sixteen teams were divided into four pools of four teams. The four pool winners will take part in play-offs to determine the two nations advancing to the World Group II Play-offs. The nations finishing last in their pools will take part in relegation play-offs, with the two losing nations being relegated to Group II for 2014.

Pools

Play-offs

  and  advanced to World Group II play-offs.

Group II
 Venue: Bellevue Club, Ulcinj, Montenegro (outdoor clay)
 Dates: 17–20 April

The eight teams were divided into two pools of four teams. The two nations placing first and second will take part in play-offs to determine the two nations advancing to Group I. The nations finishing last in their pools will take part in relegation play-offs, with the two losing nations being relegated to Group III for 2014.

Pools

Play-offs

  and  advanced to Europe/Africa Group I in 2014.

Group III
Venue: Terraten Club, Chișinău, Moldova (outdoor clay)

Dates: 8–11 May

The thirteen teams were divided into three pools of three teams and one pool of four. The four pool winners will take part in play-offs to determine the two nations advancing to Group II for 2014. The fourth nation in Pool D will not compete in the positional play-offs.

Pools

Play-offs

  and  advanced to Europe/Africa Group II in 2014.

See also
 Fed Cup structure

References

 Fed Cup Result, 2013 Europe/Africa Group I
 Fed Cup Result, 2013 Europe/Africa Group II
 Fed Cup Result, 2013 Europe/Africa Group III

External links
 Fed Cup website

 
Europe Africa
Sport in Eilat
Tennis tournaments in Israel
Sport in Ulcinj
Tennis tournaments in Montenegro
Sport in Chișinău
Tennis tournaments in Moldova